Constructivism is a theory in education which posits that individuals or learners do not acquire knowledge and understanding by passively perceiving it within a direct process of knowledge transmission, rather they construct new understandings and knowledge through experience and social discourse, integrating new information with what they already know (prior knowledge). For children, this includes knowledge gained prior to entering school. It is associated with various philosophical positions, particularly in epistemology as well as ontology, politics, and ethics. The origin of the theory is also linked to Swiss developmental psychologist Jean Piaget's theory of cognitive development.

Background 
Constructivism in education has roots in epistemology, which - in philosophy - is a theory of knowledge, which is concerned with the logical categories of knowledge and its justificational basis. Epistemology also focuses on both the warranting of the subjective knowledge of a single knower and conventional knowledge. In constructivism, hence, it is recognized that the learner has prior knowledge and experiences, which are often determined by their social and cultural environment. Learning is therefore done by students' "constructing" knowledge out of their experiences. While the Behaviorist school of learning may help understand what students are doing, educators also need to know what students are thinking, and how to enrich what students are thinking. There are scholars who state that the constructivist view emerged as a reaction to the so-called "transmission model of education", including the realist philosophy that it is based on.

Constructivism can be traced back to educational psychology in the work of Jean Piaget (1896–1980) identified with Piaget's theory of cognitive development. Piaget focused on how humans make meaning in relation to the interaction between their experiences and their ideas. His views tended to focus on human development in relation to what is occurring with an individual as distinct from development influenced by other persons. Lev Vygotsky's (1896-1934) theory of social constructivism emphasized the importance of sociocultural learning; how interactions with adults, more capable peers, and cognitive tools are internalized by learners to form mental constructs through the zone of proximal development. 
Expanding upon Vygotsky's theory Jerome Bruner and other educational psychologists developed the important concept of instructional scaffolding, whereby the social or informational environment offers supports (or scaffolds) for learning that are gradually withdrawn as they become internalized.

Views more focused on human development in the context of the social world include the sociocultural or socio-historical perspective of Lev Vygotsky and the situated cognition perspectives of Mikhail Bakhtin, Jean Lave and Etienne Wenger; Brown, Collins and Duguid; Newman, Griffin and Cole, and Barbara Rogoff.

The concept of constructivism has influenced a number of disciplines, including psychology, sociology, education and the history of science. During its infancy, constructivism examined the interaction between human experiences and their reflexes or behavior-patterns. Piaget called these systems of knowledge "schemes."

Schemes are not to be confused with schemata (schemas), a term that comes from schema theory, which is from information-processing perspectives on human cognition. Whereas Piaget's schemes are content-free, schemata (the plural of schema) are concepts; for example, most humans have a schema for "grandmother", "egg", or "magnet."

Constructivism does not refer to a specific pedagogy, although it is often confused with constructionism, an educational theory developed by Seymour Papert, inspired by constructivist and experiential learning ideas of Piaget.

Piaget's theory of constructivist learning has had wide-ranging impact on learning theories and teaching methods in education, and is an underlying theme of education reform movements.

History

Earlier educational philosophies did not place much value on what would become constructivist ideas; children's play and exploration were seen as aimless and of little importance.  Jean Piaget did not agree with these traditional views; he saw play as an important and necessary part of the student's cognitive development and provided scientific evidence for his views. Today, constructivist theories are influential throughout the formal and informal learning sectors. In museum education, constructivist theories inform exhibit design. One good example of constructivist learning in a non-formal setting is the Investigate Centre at The Natural History Museum, London. Here visitors are encouraged to explore a collection of real natural history specimens, to practice some scientific skills and make discoveries for themselves. Writers who influenced constructivism include:
John Dewey (1859–1952)
Maria Montessori (1870–1952)
Władysław Strzemiński (1893–1952)
Jean Piaget (1896–1980)
Lev Vygotsky (1896–1934)
Heinz von Foerster (1911–2002)
George Kelly (1905–1967)
Jerome Bruner (1915–2016)
Herbert Simon (1916–2001)
Paul Watzlawick (1921–2007)
Ernst von Glasersfeld (1917–2010)
Edgar Morin (born 1921)
Humberto Maturana (1928–2021)
Paulo Freire (1921-1997)

Individual

The formalization of constructivism from a within-the-human perspective is generally attributed to Jean Piaget, who articulated mechanisms by which information from the environment and ideas from the individual interact and result in internalized structures developed by learners. He identified processes of assimilation and accommodation that are key in this interaction as individuals construct new knowledge from their experiences.
 
When individuals assimilate new information, they incorporate it into an already existing framework without changing that framework. This may occur when individuals' experiences are aligned with their internal representations of the world, but may also occur as a failure to change a faulty understanding; for example, they may not notice events, may misunderstand input from others, or may decide that an event is a fluke and is therefore unimportant as information about the world. In contrast, when individuals' experiences contradict their internal representations, they may change their perceptions of the experiences to fit their internal representations.
 
According to the theory, accommodation is the process of reframing one's mental representation of the external world to fit new experiences. Accommodation can be understood as the mechanism by which failure leads to learning: when we act on the expectation that the world operates in one way and it violates our expectations, we often fail, but by accommodating this new experience and reframing our model of the way the world works, we learn from the experience of failure, or others' failure.

It is important to note that constructivism is not a particular pedagogy. In fact, constructivism is a theory describing how learning happens, regardless of whether learners are using their experiences to understand a lecture or following the instructions for building a model airplane. In both cases, the theory of constructivism suggests that learners construct knowledge out of their experiences.

However, constructivism is often associated with pedagogic approaches that promote active learning, or learning by doing. There are many critics of "learning by doing" (a.k.a. "discovery learning") as an instructional strategy (e.g. see the criticisms below). While there is much enthusiasm for constructivism as a design strategy, according to Tobias and Duffy "... to us it would appear that constructivism remains more of a philosophical framework than a theory that either allows us to precisely describe instruction or prescribe design strategies."

Constructivist learning intervention

The nature of the learner
Social constructivism not only acknowledges the uniqueness and complexity of the learner, but actually encourages, utilizes and rewards it as an integral part of the learning process.

The importance of the background and culture of the learner
Social constructivisms or socioculturalism encourage the learner or learners to arrive at his or her version of the truth, influenced by his or her background, culture or embedded worldview. Historical developments and symbol systems, such as language, logic, and mathematical systems, are inherited by the learner as a member of a particular culture and these are learned throughout the learner's life. This also stresses the importance of the nature of the learner's social interaction with knowledgeable members of the society. Without the social interaction with other more knowledgeable people, it is impossible to acquire social meaning of important symbol systems and learn how to utilize them. Young children develop their thinking abilities by interacting with other children, adults and the physical world. From the social constructivist viewpoint, it is thus important to take into account the background and culture of the learner throughout the learning process, as this background also helps to shape the knowledge and truth that the learner creates, discovers and attains in the learning process.

Responsibility for learning
Furthermore, it is argued that the responsibility of learning should reside increasingly with the student. Social constructivism thus emphasizes the importance of the student being actively involved in the learning process, unlike previous educational viewpoints where the responsibility rested with the instructor to teach and where the learner played a passive, receptive role. Von Glasersfeld (1989) emphasized that learners construct their own understanding and that they do not simply mirror and reflect what they read. Learners look for meaning and will try to find regularity and order in the events of the world even in the absence of full or complete information.

The Harkness discussion method
It is called the "Harkness" discussion method because it was developed at Phillips Exeter Academy with funds donated in the 1930s by Edward Harkness. This is also named after the Harkness table and involves students seated in a circle, motivating and controlling their own discussion. The teacher acts as little as possible. Perhaps the teacher's only function is to observe, although he/she might begin or shift or even direct a discussion. The students get it rolling, direct it, and focus it. They act as a team, cooperatively, to make it work. They all participate, but not in a competitive way. Rather, they all share in the responsibility and the goals, much as any members share in any team sport. Although the goals of any discussion will change depending upon what's under discussion, some goals will always be the same: to illuminate the subject, to unravel its mysteries, to interpret and share and learn from other points of view, to piece together the puzzle using everyone's contribution. Discussion skills are important. Everyone must be aware of how to get this discussion rolling and keep it rolling and interesting. Just as in any sport, a number of skills are necessary to work on and use at appropriate times. Everyone is expected to contribute by using these skills.

The motivation for learning
Another crucial assumption regarding the nature of the student concerns the level and source of motivation for learning. According to Von Glasersfeld, sustaining motivation to learn is strongly dependent on the student's confidence of potential for learning. These feelings of competence and belief in potential to solve new problems, are derived from first-hand experience of mastery of problems in the past and are much more important than any external acknowledgment and motivation. This links up with Vygotsky's "zone of proximal development" where students are challenged in close proximity to, yet slightly above, their current level of development. By experiencing the successful completion of challenging tasks, students gain confidence and motivation to embark on more complex challenges.

The role of the instructor

Instructors as facilitators 
According to the social constructivist approach, instructors have to adapt to the role of facilitators and not teachers. Whereas a teacher gives a didactic lecture that covers the subject matter, a facilitator helps the student to get to his or her own understanding of the content. In the former scenario the learner plays a passive role and in the latter scenario the student plays an active role in the learning process. The emphasis thus turns away from the instructor and the content, and towards the student. This dramatic change of role implies that a facilitator needs to display a totally different set of skills than that of a teacher. A teacher tells, a facilitator asks; a teacher lectures from the front, a facilitator supports from the back; a teacher gives answers according to a set curriculum, a facilitator provides guidelines and creates the environment for the learner to arrive at his or her own conclusions; a teacher mostly gives a monologue, a facilitator is in continuous dialogue with the learners. A facilitator should also be able to adapt the learning experience 'in mid-air' by taking the initiative to steer the learning experience to where the learners want to create value.

The learning environment should also be designed to support and challenge the student's thinking. While it is advocated to give the student ownership of the problem and solution process, it is not the case that any activity or any solution is adequate. The critical goal is to support the student in becoming an effective thinker. This can be achieved by assuming multiple roles, such as consultant and coach.

A few strategies for cooperative learning include: 
 Reciprocal Questioning: students work together to ask and answer questions
Jigsaw Classroom: students become "experts" on one part of a group project and teach it to the others in their group
 Structured Controversies: Students work together to research a particular controversy

Learning is an active process 
Social constructivism, strongly influenced by Vygotsky's (1978) work, suggests that knowledge is first constructed in a social context and is then appropriated by individuals. According to social constructivists, the process of sharing individual perspectives — called collaborative elaboration — results in learners constructing understanding together that wouldn't be possible alone.

Social constructivist scholars view learning as an active process where students should learn to discover principles, concepts and facts for themselves, hence the importance of encouraging guesswork and intuitive thinking in students.

Other constructivist scholars agree with this and emphasize that individuals make meanings through the interactions with each other and with the environment they live in. Knowledge is thus a product of humans and is socially and culturally constructed. McMahon (1997) agrees that learning is a social process. He further stated that learning is not a process that only takes place inside our minds, nor is it a passive development of our behaviors that is shaped by external forces. Rather, meaningful learning occurs when individuals are engaged in social activities.

Vygotsky (1978) also highlighted the convergence of the social and practical elements in learning by saying that the most significant moment in the course of intellectual development occurs when speech and practical activity, two previously completely independent lines of development, converge. Through practical activity a child constructs meaning on an intra-personal level, while speech connects this meaning with the interpersonal world shared by the child and her/his culture.

Good relationship between instructor and student 
A further characteristic of the role of the facilitator in the social constructivist viewpoint, is that the instructor and the students are equally involved in learning from each other as well. This means that the learning experience is both subjective and objective and requires that the instructor's culture, values and background become an essential part of the interplay between students and tasks in the shaping of meaning. Students compare their version of thought with that of the instructor and fellow students to get to a new, socially tested version of context. The task or problem is thus the interface between the instructor and the student. This creates a dynamic interaction between task, instructor and student. This entails that students and instructors should develop an awareness of each other's viewpoints and then look to their own beliefs, standards and values, thus being both subjective and objective at the same time.

Some studies argue for the importance of mentoring in the process of learning. The social constructivist model thus emphasizes the importance of the relationship between the student and the instructor in the learning process.

Some learning approaches that could harbour this interactive learning include reciprocal teaching, peer collaboration, cognitive apprenticeship, problem-based instruction, web quests, Anchored Instruction and other approaches that involve learning with others.

Collaboration among learners

Learners with different skills and backgrounds should collaborate in tasks and discussions to arrive at a shared understanding of the truth in a specific field.

Some social constructivist models also stress the need for collaboration among learners, in direct contradiction to traditional competitive approaches. One Vygotskian notion that has significant implications for peer collaboration, is that of the zone of proximal development. Defined as the distance between the actual developmental level as determined by independent problem-solving and the level of potential development as determined through problem-solving under adult guidance or in collaboration with more capable peers, it differs from the fixed biological nature of Piaget's stages of development. Through a process of 'scaffolding' a learner can be extended beyond the limitations of physical maturation to the extent that the development process lags behind the learning process.

If students have to present and train new contents with their classmates, a non-linear process of collective knowledge-construction will be set up.

The importance of context
The social constructivist paradigm views the context in which the learning occurs as central to the learning itself.

Underlying the notion of the learner as an active processor is "the assumption that there is no one set of generalised learning laws with each law applying to all domains". Decontextualised knowledge does not give us the skills to apply our understandings to authentic tasks because we are not working with the concept in the complex environment and experiencing the complex interrelationships in that environment that determine how and when the concept is used. One social constructivist notion is that of authentic or situated learning, where the student takes part in activities directly relevant to the application of learning and that take place within a culture similar to the applied setting. Cognitive apprenticeship has been proposed as an effective constructivist model of learning that attempts to "enculturate students into authentic practices through activity and social interaction in a way similar to that evident, and evidently successful, in craft apprenticeship".

Holt and Willard-Holt (2000) emphasize the concept of dynamic assessment, which is a way of assessing the true potential of learners that differs significantly from conventional tests. Here, the essentially interactive nature of learning is extended to the process of assessment. Rather than viewing assessment as a process carried out by one person, such as an instructor, it is seen as a two-way process involving interaction between both instructor and learner. The role of the assessor becomes one of entering into dialogue with the persons being assessed to find out their current level of performance on any task and sharing with them possible ways in which that performance might be improved on a subsequent occasion. Thus, assessment and learning are seen as inextricably linked and not separate processes.

According to this viewpoint, instructors should see assessment as a continuous and interactive process that measures the achievement of the learner, the quality of the learning experience and courseware. The feedback created by the assessment process serves as a direct foundation for further development.

The selection, scope, and sequencing of the subject matter

Knowledge should be discovered as an integrated whole 
Knowledge should not be divided into different subjects or compartments, but should be discovered as an integrated whole.

This also again underlines the importance of the context in which learning is presented. The world, in which the learner needs to operate, does not approach one in the form of different subjects, but as a complex myriad of facts, problems, dimensions, and perceptions.

Engaging and challenging the student 
Learners should constantly be challenged with tasks that refer to skills and knowledge just beyond their current level of mastery. This captures their motivation and builds on previous successes to enhance student confidence. This is in line with Vygotsky's zone of proximal development, which can be described as the distance between the actual developmental level (as determined by independent problem-solving) and the level of potential development (as determined through problem-solving under adult guidance or in collaboration with more capable peers).

Vygotsky (1978) further claimed that instruction is good only when it proceeds ahead of development. Then it awakens and rouses to life an entire set of functions in the stage of maturing, which lie in the zone of proximal development. It is in this way that instruction plays an extremely important role in development.

To fully engage and challenge the student, the task and learning environment should reflect the complexity of the environment that the student should be able to function in at the end of learning. Students must not only have ownership of the learning or problem-solving process, but of the problem itself.

Where the sequencing of subject matter is concerned, it is the constructivist viewpoint that the foundations of any subject may be taught to anybody at any stage in some form. This means that instructors should first introduce the basic ideas that form topics or subject areas, and then revisit and build upon these repeatedly. This notion has been extensively used in curricula.

It is important for instructors to realize that although a curriculum may be set down for them, it inevitably becomes shaped by them into something personal that reflects their own belief systems, their thoughts and feelings about both the content of their instruction and their students. Thus, the learning experience becomes a shared enterprise. The emotions and life contexts of those involved in the learning process must therefore be considered as an integral part of learning. The goal of the student is central in considering why to learn.

The structuredness of the learning process 
It is important to achieve the right balance between the degree of structure and flexibility that is built into the learning process. Savery (1994) contends that the more structured the learning environment, the harder it is for the learners to construct meaning based on their conceptual understandings. A facilitator should structure the learning experience just enough to make sure that the students get clear guidance and parameters within which to achieve the learning objectives, yet the learning experience should be open and free enough to allow for the learners to discover, enjoy, interact and arrive at their own, socially verified version of truth.

In adult learning
Constructivist ideas have been used to inform adult education. Current trends in higher education push for more "active learning" teaching approaches which are often based on constructivist views.

Approaches based on constructivism stress the importance of mechanisms for mutual planning, diagnosis of learner needs and interests, cooperative learning climate, sequential activities for achieving the objectives, formulation of learning objectives based on the diagnosed needs and interests. While adult learning often stresses the importance of personal relevance of the content, involvement of the learner in the process, and deeper understanding of underlying concepts, all of these are principles that may benefit learners of all ages as even children connect their every day experiences to what they learn.

Pedagogies based on constructivism

Various approaches in pedagogy derive from constructivist theory. They usually suggest that learning is accomplished best using a hands-on approach. Learners learn by experimentation, and not by being told what will happen, and are left to make their own inferences, discoveries and conclusions.

Supportive research and evidence

Hmelo-Silver, Duncan, & Chinn cite several studies supporting the success of the constructivist problem-based and inquiry learning methods. For example, they describe a project called GenScope, an inquiry-based science software application. Students using the GenScope software showed significant gains over the control groups, with the largest gains shown in students from basic courses.

Hmelo-Silver et al. also cite a large study by Geier on the effectiveness of inquiry-based science for middle school students, as demonstrated by their performance on high-stakes standardized tests. The improvement was 14% for the first cohort of students and 13% for the second cohort. This study also found that inquiry-based teaching methods greatly reduced the achievement gap for African-American students.

Guthrie et al. (2004) compared three instructional methods for third-grade reading: a traditional approach, a strategies instruction only approach, and an approach with strategies instruction and constructivist motivation techniques including student choices, collaboration, and hands-on activities. The constructivist approach, called CORI (Concept-Oriented Reading Instruction), resulted in better student reading comprehension, cognitive strategies, and motivation.

Jong Suk Kim found that using constructivist teaching methods for 6th graders resulted in better student achievement than traditional teaching methods. This study also found that students preferred constructivist methods over traditional ones. However, Kim did not find any difference in student self-concept or learning strategies between those taught by constructivist or traditional methods.

Doğru and Kalender compared science classrooms using traditional teacher-centered approaches to those using student-centered, constructivist methods. In their initial test of student performance immediately following the lessons, they found no significant difference between traditional and constructivist methods. However, in the follow-up assessment 15 days later, students who learned through constructivist methods showed better retention of knowledge than those who learned through traditional methods.

Criticism 
Several cognitive psychologists and educators have questioned the central claims of constructivism.  It is argued that constructivist theories are misleading or contradict known findings. Matthews (1993) attempts to sketch the influence of constructivism in current mathematics and science education, aiming to indicate how pervasive Aristotle's empiricist epistemology is within it and what problems constructivism faces on that account.

In the neo-Piagetian theories of cognitive development it is maintained that learning at any age depends upon the processing and representational resources available at this particular age.  That is, it is maintained that if the requirements of the concept to be understood exceeds the available processing efficiency and working memory resources then the concept is by definition not learnable. This attitude toward learning impedes the learning from understanding essential theoretical concepts or, in other words, reasoning. Therefore, no matter how active a child is during learning, to learn the child must operate in a learning environment that meets the developmental and individual learning constraints that are characteristic for the child's age and this child's possible deviations from her age's norm. If this condition is not met, construction goes astray.

Several educators have also questioned the effectiveness of this approach toward instructional design, especially as it applies to the development of instruction for novices. While some constructivists argue that "learning by doing" enhances learning, critics of this instructional strategy argue that little empirical evidence exists to support this statement given novice learners. Sweller and his colleagues argue that novices do not possess the underlying mental models, or "schemas" necessary for "learning by doing". Indeed, Mayer (2004) reviewed the literature and found that fifty years of empirical data do not support using the constructivist teaching technique of pure discovery; in those situations requiring discovery, he argues for the use of guided discovery instead.

Mayer (2004) argues that not all teaching techniques based on constructivism are efficient or effective for all learners, suggesting many educators misapply constructivism to use teaching techniques that require learners to be behaviorally active. He describes this inappropriate use of constructivism as the "constructivist teaching fallacy". "I refer to this interpretation as the constructivist teaching fallacy because it equates active learning with active teaching." Instead Mayer proposes learners should be "cognitively active" during learning and that instructors use "guided practice."

In contrast, Kirschner et al. (2006) describe constructivist teaching methods as "unguided methods of instruction." They suggest more structured learning activities for learners with little to no prior knowledge. Slezak states that constructivism "is an example of fashionable but thoroughly problematic doctrines that can have little benefit for practical pedagogy or teacher education." Similar views have been stated by Meyer, Boden, Quale and others.

Kirschner et al. group a number of learning theories together (Discovery, Problem-Based, Experiential, and Inquiry-Based learning) and stated that highly scaffolded constructivist methods like problem-based learning and inquiry learning are ineffective. Kirschner et al. described several research studies that were favorable to problem-based learning given learners were provided some level of guidance and support.

A rebuttal to the criticisms of Kirschner, Sweller, and Clark
While there are critics of the Kirschner, Sweller, and Clark article, Sweller and his associates have written in their articles about:
instructional designs for producing procedural learning (learning as behavior change);
their grouping of seemingly disparate learning theories and;
a continuum of guidance beginning with worked examples that may be followed by practice, or transitioned to practice (Renkl, Atkinson, Maier, and Staley, 2002)

Kirschner et al. (2006) describe worked examples as an instructional design solution for procedural learning. Clark, Nguyen, and Sweller (2006) describe this as a very effective, empirically validated method of teaching learners procedural skill acquisition. Evidence for learning by studying worked-examples, is known as the worked-example effect and has been found to be useful in many domains (e.g. music, chess, athletics) concept mapping, geometry, physics, mathematics, or programming.

Kirschner et al. (2006) describe why they group a series of seemingly disparate learning theories (Discovery, Problem-Based, Experiential, and Inquiry-Based learning). The reasoning for this grouping is because each learning theory promotes the same constructivist teaching technique—"learning by doing." While they argue "learning by doing" is useful for more knowledgeable learners, they argue this teaching technique is not useful for novices. Mayer states that it promotes behavioral activity too early in the learning process, when learners should be cognitively active.

In addition, Sweller and his associates describe a continuum of guidance, starting with worked examples to slowly fade guidance. This continuum of faded guidance has been tested empirically to produce a series of learning effects: the worked-example effect, the guidance fading effect, and the expertise-reversal effect.

Criticism of discovery-based teaching techniques

Mayer (2004) argues against discovery-based teaching techniques and provides an extensive review to support this argument. Mayer's arguments are against pure discovery, and are not specifically aimed at constructivism: "Nothing in this article should be construed as arguing against the view of learning as knowledge construction or against using hands-on inquiry or group discussion that promotes the process of knowledge construction in learners. The main conclusion I draw from the three research literatures I have reviewed is that it would be a mistake to interpret the current constructivist view of learning as a rationale for reviving pure discovery as a method of instruction."

Mayer's concern is how one applies discovery-based teaching techniques. He provides empirical research as evidence that discovery-based teaching techniques are inadequate. Here he cites this literature and makes his point "For example, a recent replication is research showing that students learn to become better at solving mathematics problems when they study worked-out examples rather than when they solely engage in hands-on problem solving. Today's proponents of discovery methods, who claim to draw their support from constructivist philosophy, are making inroads into educational practice. Yet a dispassionate review of the relevant research literature shows that discovery-based practice is not as effective as guided discovery."

Mayer's point is that people often misuse constructivism to promote pure discovery-based teaching techniques. He proposes that the instructional design recommendations of constructivism are too often aimed at discovery-based practice. Sweller (1988) found evidence that practice by novices during early schema acquisition, distracts these learners with unnecessary search-based activity, when the learner's attention should be focused on understanding (acquiring schemas).

The study by Kirschner et al. from which the quote at the beginning of this section was taken has been widely cited and is important for showing the limits of minimally-guided instruction. Hmelo-Silver et al. responded, pointing out that Kirschner et al. conflated constructivist teaching techniques such as inquiry learning with "discovery learning". (See the preceding two sections of this article.) This would agree with Mayer's viewpoint that even though constructivism as a theory and teaching techniques incorporating guidance are likely valid applications of this theory, nevertheless a tradition of misunderstanding  has led to some question "pure discovery" techniques.

The math wars and discovery-based teaching techniques

The math wars controversy in the United States is an example of the type of heated debate that sometimes follows the implementation of constructivist-inspired curricula in schools. In the 1990s, mathematics textbooks based on new standards largely informed by constructivism were developed and promoted with government support. Although constructivist theory does not require eliminating instruction entirely, some textbooks seemed to recommend this extreme. Some parents and mathematicians protested the design of textbooks that omitted or de-emphasized instruction of standard mathematical methods. Supporters responded that the methods were to be eventually discovered under direction by the teacher, but since this was missing or unclear, many insisted the textbooks were designed to deliberately eliminate instruction of standard methods. In one commonly adopted text, the standard formula for the area of a circle is to be derived in the classroom, but not actually printed in the student textbook as is explained by the developers of CMP: "The student role of formulating, representing, clarifying, communicating, and reflecting on ideas leads to an increase in learning. If the format of the texts included many worked examples, the student role would then become merely reproducing these examples with small modifications."

Similarly, this approach has been applied to reading with whole language and inquiry-based science that emphasizes the importance of devising rather than just performing hands-on experiments as early as the elementary grades (traditionally done by research scientists), rather than studying facts. In other areas of curriculum such as social studies and writing are relying more on "higher order thinking skills" rather than memorization of dates, grammar or spelling rules or reciting correct answers. Advocates of this approach counter that the constructivism does not require going to extremes, that in fact teachable moments should regularly infuse the experience with the more traditional teaching. The primary differentiation from the traditional approach being that the engagement of the students in their learning makes them more receptive to learning things at an appropriate time, rather than on a preset schedule.

Importance of structure in constructivist learning environments

During the 1990s, several theorists began to study the cognitive load of novices (those with little or no prior knowledge of the subject matter) during problem solving. Cognitive load theory was applied in several contexts. Based on the results of their research, these authors do not support the idea of allowing novices to interact with ill-structured learning environments. Ill-structured learning environments rely on the learner to discover problem solutions. Jonassen (1997) also suggested that novices be taught with "well-structured" learning environments.

Jonassen (1997) also proposed well-designed, well-structured learning environments provide scaffolding for problem-solving. Finally, both Sweller and Jonassen support problem-solving scenarios for more advanced learners.

Sweller and his associates even suggest well-structured learning environments, like those provided by worked examples, are not effective for those with more experience—this was later described as the "expertise reversal effect". Cognitive load theorists suggest worked examples initially, with a gradual introduction of problem solving scenarios; this is described as the "guidance fading effect" Each of these ideas provides more evidence for Anderson's ACT-R framework. This ACT-R framework suggests learning can begin with studying examples.

Finally Mayer states: "Thus, the contribution of psychology is to help move educational reform efforts from the fuzzy and unproductive world of educational ideology—which sometimes hides under the banner of various versions of constructivism—to the sharp and productive world of theory-based research on how people learn."

Confusion between constructivist and maturationist views

Many people confuse constructivist with maturationist views. The constructivist (or cognitive-developmental) stream "is based on the idea that the dialectic or interactionist process of development and learning through the student's active construction should be facilitated and promoted by adults". Whereas, "The romantic maturationist stream is based on the idea that the student's naturally occurring development should be allowed to flower without adult interventions in a permissive environment." In other words, adults play an active role in guiding learning in constructivism, while they are expected to allow children to guide themselves in maturationism.

Contextual constructivism 

According to William Cobern (1991) Contextual constructivism is "about understanding the fundamental, culturally based beliefs that both students and teachers bring to class, and how these beliefs are supported by culture. Contextual constructivists not only raise new research questions, they also call for a new research paradigm. The focus on contextualization means that qualitative, especially ethnographic, techniques are to be preferred" (p. 3).

Radical constructivism 

Ernst von Glasersfeld developed radical constructivism by coupling Piaget's theory of learning and philosophical viewpoint about the nature of knowledge with Kant's rejection of an objective reality independent of human perception or reason. Radical constructivism does not view knowledge as an attempt to generate ideas that match an independent, objective reality. Instead, theories and knowledge about the world, as generated by our senses and reason, either fit within the constraints of whatever reality may exist and, thus, are viable or do not and are not viable.  As a theory of education, radical constructivism emphasizes the experiences of the learner, differences between learners and the importance of uncertainty.

Relational constructivism 

Björn Kraus' relational constructivism can be perceived as a relational consequence of radical constructivism. In contrast to social constructivism, it picks up the epistemological threads and maintains the radical constructivist idea that humans cannot overcome their limited conditions of reception. Despite the subjectivity of human constructions of reality, relational constructivism focuses on the relational conditions that apply to human perceptional processes.

Social constructivism 
In recent decades, constructivist theorists have extended the traditional focus on individual learning to address collaborative and social dimensions of learning. It is possible to see social constructivism as a bringing together of aspects of the work of Piaget with that of Bruner and Vygotsky.

Communal constructivism 
The concept Communal constructivism was developed by Leask and Younie in 1995 through their research on the European SchoolNet which demonstrated the value of experts collaborating to push the boundaries of knowledge i.e. communal construction of new knowledge between experts rather than social construction of knowledge as described by Vygotsky where there is a learner to teacher scaffolding relationship. "Communal constructivism" as a concept applies to those situations in which there is currently no expert knowledge or research to underpin knowledge in an area. "Communal constructivism" refers specifically to the process of experts working together to create, record and publish new knowledge in emerging areas. In the seminal European SchoolNet research where for the first time academics were testing out how the internet could support classroom practice and pedagogy, experts from a number of countries set up test situations to generate and understand new possibilities for educational practice.

Bryan Holmes in 2001 applied this to student learning as described in an early paper, "in this model, students will not simply pass through a course like water through a sieve but instead leave their own imprint in the learning process."

Influence on computer science and robotics 

Constructivism has influenced the course of programming and computer science. Some famous programming languages have been created, wholly or in part, for educational use, to support the constructionist theory of Seymour Papert. These languages have been dynamically typed, and reflective. Logo and its successor Scratch are the best known of them. Constructivism has also informed the design of interactive machine learning systems, whereas Radical Constructivism has been explored as a paradigm to design experiments in rehabilitation robotics, more precisely in prosthetics.

See also

 Autodidactism
 Connectivism
 Constructivist epistemology
 Critical pedagogy
 Cultural-historical activity theory (CHAT)
 Educational psychology
 Learning styles
 Philosophy of education
 Reform mathematics
 Situated cognition
 Socratic method
 Teaching for social justice
 Vocational education

References

Further reading

  
 

 
 
 
 
Dalgarno, B. (1996) Constructivist computer assisted learning: theory and technique, ASCILITE Conference, 2–4 December 1996, retrieved from https://web.archive.org/web/20140902003411/http://www.ascilite.org.au/conferences/adelaide96/papers/21.html
Hilbert, T. S., & Renkl, A. (2007). Learning how to Learn by Concept Mapping: A Worked-Example Effect. Oral presentation at the 12th Biennial Conference EARLI 2007 in Budapest, Hungary
Jeffery, G. (ed) (2005) The creative college: building a successful learning culture in the arts, Stoke-on-Trent: Trentham Books.
Jonassen, D., Mayes, T., & McAleese, R. (1993). A manifesto for a constructivist approach to uses of technology in higher education. In T.M. Duffy, J. Lowyck, & D.H. Jonassen (Eds.), Designing environments for constructive learning (pp. 231–247). Heidelberg: Springer-Verlag.
 
Piaget, Jean. (1950). The Psychology of Intelligence. New York: Routledge.
 Jean Piaget (1967). Logique et Connaissance scientifique, Encyclopédie de la Pléiade.

External links

 A journey into Constructivism by Martin Dougiamas, 1998–11.
 Cognitively Guided Instruction reviewed on the Promising Practices Network
 Sample Online Activity Objects Designed with Constructivist Approach (2007)
 Liberal Exchange learning resources offering a constructivist approach to learning English as a second/foreign language  (2009)
 Lutz, S., & Huitt, W. (2018). "Connecting cognitive development and constructivism." In W. Huitt (Ed.), Becoming a Brilliant Star: Twelve core ideas supporting holistic education (pp. 45–63). IngramSpark. 
 Definition of Constructivism by Martin Ryder (a footnote to the book chapter The Cyborg and the Noble Savage where Ryder discusses One Laptop Per Child's XO laptop from a constructivist educator's point of view)

Education reform
Alternative education
Educational psychology
Constructivism

no:Konstruktivisme